The USA Water Polo Hall of Fame, located in Irvine, California, is a hall of fame dedicated to honoring players, coaches and officials who have contributed greatly to the game of water polo in the United States of America. It was established in 1976 by the USA Water Polo, which is the national governing body in the country.

Committee

 Brent Bohlender, Chair
 Adam Wright
 Brenda Villa
 Dion Gray
 Heather Moody
 Kirk Everist
 Natalie Golda Benson
 Scot Schulte

Inductees
As of 2020, 230 individuals have been elected.

1970s

Class of 1976
 Kenneth M. Beck
 Lemoine S. Case
 Austin R. Clapp
 John J. Curren
 Harold N. Dash
 Phillip B. Daubenspeck
 Dixon Fiske
 Samuel J. Greller
 Lou DeBrenda Handley
 Robert E. Hughes
 Edward L. Jaworski
 William A. Kooistra
 Michael J. McDermott
 Perry McGillivray
 Jay-Ehret Mahoney
 Wallace O'Connor
 John Robinson
 Urho (Whitney) Saari
 George E. Schroth
 James R. Smith
 Frank Sullivan
 Vernon "Vern" Tittle
 Herbert E. "Hal" Vollmer
 Paul Wacker
 Wallace P. "Wally" Wolf

Class of 1977
 Frederick Bassett
 Marvin "Ace" D. Burns
 Ronald Crawford
 Joseph Farley
 Robert Horn
 Samuel Kooistra
 John Miller
 H. Jamison Handy
 Joseph Ruddy
 Raymond Ruddy
 Ronald Severa

Class of 1979
 Arthur Austin
 Charles Bittick
 Ralph Budelman
 James Gaughran
 Fred Lauer

1980s

Class of 1980
 Bob Bray
 Harry A. Bisbey
 Harry Hebner
 Charles McCallister
 Francis McDermott
 Charles McIlroy
 George Mitchell
 R. Max Ritter
 Clyde Swendsen
 Donald Tierney

Class of 1981
 Robert Frojen
 Donald Good
 Neil Kohlhase
 Charlie Schroeder
 Albert Schwartz
 John Spargo
 Calvert Strong
 William Vosburg

Class of 1982
 Carl Bauer
 Steven Barnett
 Andrew Burke
 Elmer Collett
 Kenneth Hahn
 Arthur Koblish
 Robert Koehler
 Francis Moorman
 John Parker
 Roy Saari
 Gary Sheerer
 Anthony Van Dorp
 Dean Willeford

Class of 1983
 David Ashleigh
 Devere "Chris" Christensen
 Charles Finn
 William Kelly
 Bruce Kidder
 Edwin Knox
 Richard "Hoot" Newman
 William Ross
 Burton Shaw
 Herbert Wildman

Class of 1984
 Peter Asch
 Bruce Bradley
 Stanley Cole
 James Ferguson
 Robert Helmick
 George Stransky
 Russell Webb
 Barry Weitzenberg

Class of 1985
 A. M. "Pete" Archer
 Heber Holloway
 Marty Hull
 Arthur Lambert
 Terry Sayring

Class of 1986
 David "Jay" Flood

Class of 1987
 Peter Schnugg

Class of 1988
 Eric Lindroth
 Gus Sundstrom
 George Van Cleaf

Class of 1989
 Frank F. Connor
 Christopher "Chris" T. Dorst
 Ogden Reid
 John Siman
 Jon Svendsen
 William Hale Thompson

1990s

Class of 1990
 John R. Felix
 William "Bill" W.R. Schroeder
 Ronald "Ron" L. Volmer
 Otto Wahle

Class of 1991
 Andrew "Drew" McDonald
 Timothy A. Shaw

Class of 1992
 Gary Figueroa
 Robert K. "Bob" Gaughran
 Becky Shaw
 Joseph Michael "Joe" Vargas

Class of 1993
 William "Buck" Dawson
 Barbara J. Kalbus
 William "Eagle" McMarthy
 Kenneth M. "Monte" Nitzkowski
 James W. "Jim" Schultz

Class of 1994
 Arthur D. "Art" Adamson
 Jules J. Ameno
 Douglas Lambert "Doug" Burke
 Jody D. Campbell
 Charles B. "Shorty" Dwight III
 Steven "Harpo" Hamann
 Charles "Chuck" Metz
 George Ratkovic
 Kevin Robertson
 Norton D. "Nort" Thorton

Class of 1995
 Paul "Bear" Barren
 Peter J. "Pete" Cutino
 Tom Hermstad

Class of 1996
 Charles H. "Charlie" Harris
 Ralph W. Hale M.D.
 Robert E. Lee Jr.

Class of 1997
 Andrew F. "Andy" Habermann
 William U. "Bill" Harris
 Stanley E. "Stan" Sprague
 Kenneth "Ken" Lindgren

Class of 1998
 Greg Boyer
 Richard J. Foster
 Steve Heaston
 Janice Krauser
 Sandra H. "Sandy" Nitta

Class of 1999
 Jane Hale
 Edward W. "Ed" Reed Jr.
 Terry A. Schroeder
 James "Jim" Slatton
 Craig "Willy" Wilson

2000s

Class of 2000
 William "Bill" Barnett
 Peter Campbell
 Dennis "Fos" Fosdick
 William "Bill" Frady
 Gordon "Gordie" Hall
 Ken "Ham" Hamdorf
 Richard F. "Doc" Hunkler
 Douglas "Doug" Kimbell
 Craig Klass
 John D. Williams

Class of 2001
 Brent Bohlender
 Jeffery Campbell
 Christopher D. "Chris" Duplanty
 Mike "Evo" Evans
 Roger Nekton
 Michael "Mike" Schofield
 Scott Schulte
 Mary Sprague

Class of 2002
 James Bergeson
 Donald H. Clooney
 Dante Dettamanti
 Jeffery N. Heidmous
 Dr. Alan Mouchawar

Class of 2003
 William K. Anttila
 Laura Baker
 Theresa Bixby
 Richard Draz
 Dion Gray
 Frank Hassett
 David A. Heck
 Kathy Jo Horne
 Lynn Comer Kachmarik
 Kelvin Parker Kemp
 Maureen "Mo" O'Toole

Class of 2004
 Kirk Everist
 Vaune Kadlubek
 Maggi Kelly
 Walter "Wally" Lundt
 James "Moose" Mulcrone
 Alex Rousseau
 Lynn Wittstock

2010s

Class of 2010
 Bret Bernard
 Heather Moody
 Edward Rudloff
 Kathy "Gubba" Sheehy
 Peter Ueberroth
 Jamey Wright

Class of 2011
 Robin Beauregard
 Michael Garibaldi
 Jennie Jacobsen-Huse
 Kyle Kopp
 Wolf Wigo

Class of 2012
 Bill Brown
 Ellen Estes Lee
 Margo Miranda

Class of 2014
 Edward Newland
 Jim Sprague
 Andy Takata
 Sandy Vessey-Schneider

Class of 2015
 Natalie Golda Benson
 Richard Corso
 Amber Drury

Class of 2018
 Guy Baker
 Scott Hinman
 Chris Humbert
 Heather Petri
 Brenda Villa

Class of 2019
 Elizabeth Armstrong
 Ryan Bailey
 Jeff Powers
 Jessica Steffens
 John Tanner
 Lauren Wenger
 Adam Wright

2020s

Class of 2020
 Gavin Arroyo
 Gary Robinett
 Kelly Rulon
 Bruce Wigo
 Elsie Windes

Class of 2021
 Courtney Mathewson
 Kami Craig
 Ericka Lorenz
 Tony Azevedo
 Merrill Moses

Class of 2022
 Layne Beaubien
 Kelli Billish-Fitter
 Bob Corb
 Russ Hafferkamp
 John Vargas

See also
 Peter J. Cutino Award: another water polo award in the United States
 International Swimming Hall of Fame
 Water Polo Australia Hall of Fame

References

External links
 Hall of Fame - USA Water Polo

Hall of Fame
United States
Water Polo
Water Polo
Awards established in 1976